Nathan Hollingsworth (born 3 August 1978) is an Australian former professional rugby league footballer who played for Parramatta and Manly-Warringah in the National Rugby League (NRL).

A Canberra raised player, Hollingsworth started his career at the Raiders, representing the club in the lower grades.

Hollingsworth, who played as a hooker, got his opportunity to play first-grade when he joined Parramatta. Late in the 2002 NRL season he replaced an injured Daniel Irvine and kept his spot in the team for the remainder of the season, which included the qualifying final loss to the Brisbane Broncos.

In 2004 he switched to Manly and featured in 11 first-grade games that season.

Coaching
He coached the Connecticut Wildcats in the USA in 2006 for one season.

References

External links
Nathan Hollingsworth at Rugby League project

1978 births
Living people
Australian rugby league players
Connecticut Wildcats coaches
Manly Warringah Sea Eagles players
Parramatta Eels players
Rugby league players from the Australian Capital Territory
Rugby league hookers